The substituted benzofurans are a class of chemical compounds based on the heterocyclyc and polycyclic compound benzofuran. Many medicines use the benzofuran core as a scaffold, but most commonly the term is used to refer to the simpler compounds in this class which include numerous psychoactive drugs, including stimulants, psychedelics and empathogens. In general, these compounds have a benzofuran core to which a 2-aminoethyl group is attached (at any position), and combined with a range of other substituents. Some psychoactive derivatives from this family have been sold under the name Benzofury.

List of substituted benzofurans 
The derivatives may be produced by substitutions at six locations of the benzofuran molecule, as well as saturation of the 2,3- double bond.

The following table displays notable derivatives that have been reported:

Legislation 
Substituted benzofurans saw widespread use as recreational drugs by being sold as research chemicals making them exempt from drug legislation. Many of the more common compounds were banned in the UK in June 2013 as temporary class drugs, while others have been made permanently illegal in various jurisdictions.

See also 
 2-Aminoethoxydiphenyl borate (an unrelated compound also known as 2-APB)
 2C-B-BUTTERFLY
 5-IT
 AL-38022A
 IBF5MAP
 Jimscaline
 Substituted amphetamines
 Substituted cathinones
 Substituted methylenedioxyphenethylamines
 Substituted phenethylamines

References 

Stimulants
Benzofurans
Designer drugs